Angelo Froglia (23 March 1955 – 11 January 1997) was an Italian painter and sculptor mostly known for being involved in the scandal of the sculptures falsely attributed to Amedeo Modigliani in 1984.

Biography
Angelo Froglia was born in Livorno. He attended the Accademia di Belle Arti in Florence. In 1971 he returned to Livorno where he rented a studio and started painting. In 1974 he participated to the 10th edition of the Rome Quadriennale. In 1977, during the Years of Lead, he took part in the armed struggle and ended up in jail. He was released in 1981 and moved back to Livorno where he resumed painting.

In 1984 Froglia sculpted a false Modigliani's head and threw it in the town's canal. The sculpture was initially deemed as authentic before Froglia and others exposed the hoax. Froglia also made a video about the event entitled "Peitho e Apate ... della persuasione e dell'inganno (Cherchez Modi)" and was given an award at the Turin Film Festival in 1984. From 1985 he produced a great number of paintings and organised exhibitions in Italy and abroad, although his health was undermined by an excessive use of recreational drugs. 
Although Froglia never considered his role in the Modigliani scandal as a "hoax" but rather as an artistic performance, he grew tired of being associated with it. Shortly before his death, Froglia told his friend and art critic Massimo Carboni that, "Time does not count, I work within my possibilities. The important thing is the conviction that you put into it."

Angelo Froglia died following a long illness on 11 January 1997.

Selected exhibitions
 1974  10th Rome Quadriennale
 1975  Immagine critica, Casa della Cultura, Livorno
 1984  L'altro Modigliani, Museo Villa Maria, Livorno
 1985  Festival Internazionale del Cinema, Turin
 1992  Mediterranea e altre storie, Galleria Rotini, Livorno
 1997  Retrospettiva 1973-1996, Maritime Station, Livorno
 2010  Angelo Ritrovato, Centro Culturale Michon, Livorno

References

 Luciano Bonetti, Annuario degli artisti labronici, 1976
 Duccio Trombadori and Nicola Micieli, Retrospettiva 1973-1996, Edizioni Graphis Arte, Livorno
 Nicola Micieli, Mediterranea e altre storie, Bandecchi & Vivaldi, Pontedera, 1992
 Massimo Carboni, "Angelo Froglia Un cuore buono, una mano felice", Il Tirreno, 11 January 1997
 Alice Barontini, "Angelo Froglia, l'artista che sbugiardò la critica", Il Tirreno, 20 August 2009
 Alice Barontini, "Vittorio Sgarbi vuole le false teste di Modi", Il Tirreno, 22 August 2009
 Alice Barontini, Alla ricerca di Modi: Angelo Froglia e la performance che mise in crisi la critica, Edizioni Polistampa, Livorno, 2010

Notes
 1   Modì, su e-Bay la testa fatta da Froglia. Il Tirreno
2 Testa alla Modigliani, parla il fratello del Froglia. artimes.it

External links
I misteri Angelo Froglia
Torino Film Festival
Amedeo Modigliani le teste ritrovate nel fosso di Livorno
Il mistero delle teste di Amedeo Modigliani filmato

20th-century Italian painters
20th-century Italian male artists
Italian male painters
Italian male sculptors
Italian contemporary artists
1997 deaths
1955 births